241 (two hundred [and] forty-one) is the natural number between 240 and 242. It is also a prime number.

241 is the larger of the twin primes (239, 241).  Twin primes are pairs of primes separated by 2. 

241 is a regular prime and a lucky prime. 

Since 241 = 15 × 24 + 1, it is a Proth prime.

241 is a repdigit in base 15 (111).

241 is the only known Lucas–Wieferich prime to (U, V) = (3, −1).

References 

Integers